Edmund James "Ted" Banfield  (4 September 1852 – 2 June 1923) was an author and naturalist in Queensland, Australia. He is best known for his book Confessions of a Beachcomber. His grave on Dunk Island is listed on the Queensland Heritage Register.

Early life
Banfield was born in Liverpool, England the son of Jabez Walter Banfield (1820–1899), printer, and his wife Sarah Ann, née Smith. Banfield was brought while a boy to Australia by his father, who settled at Ararat, Victoria in 1852 and became proprietor of a newspaper, the Ararat Advertiser. Edmund Banfield received his first training in journalism on this paper.

Career
Banfield had experience with newspapers in Melbourne and Sydney in the 1870s, and in 1882 went to Townsville, Queensland, where he became sub-editor of the Townsville Bulletin. In 1884 he visited England, the voyage providing the material for a pamphlet, The Torres Strait Route from Queensland to England (1885).

While in England, Banfield met his future wife, Bertha Golding, and they were married at Townsville in 1886. Banfield remained at the Townsville Bulletin until 1897 until he resigned, being diagnosed with tuberculosis and in a state of nervous collapse. Banfield and his deaf wife then settled on Dunk Island off the North Queensland coast. With his health improving, he obtained a 30-year lease of 129 ha (320 acres) of land on Dunk Island on 4 January 1900 and lived 23 more years of a comparatively solitary life. A house was constructed, fruit-trees and vegetables were planted; goats and cattle provided them with milk, butter and occasionally meat, and there were abundant fish in the surrounding seas. Most importantly there were the immense possibilities of the nature study which made up so much of the charm of his books. For nine months in 1901, Banfield took the place of a former colleague at Townsville who was travelling abroad. Except for occasional short holidays on the mainland, he spent the rest of his days on the island. In 1907 he wrote a tourists' guide for the Queensland government, Within the Barrier, and in 1908 appeared his Confessions of a Beachcomber which immediately gave him a place of his own among Australian writers. This was followed by My Tropic Isle (1911), and Tropic Days (1918). His Last Leaves from Dunk Island was published posthumously in 1925 in collaboration with Alec Chisholm and Bertha Banfield.

The title of Banfield's first serious book, Confessions of a Beachcomber, was misleading; he was no mere collector of trifling tales or a beachcomber in the nineteenth century tradition of a ship-wrecked sailor. Although the suggestion for the title came from the breaking up of a wreck on the coast many miles away which resulted in much debris drifting to the island. He worked hard on his plantation, and in its early days he found that work on a tropical island had its own difficulties. Once these were overcome he could get enough leisure to study the vegetable, bird and sea life of the island, and, the Aborigines before they were taken away and placed on a reservation. Visitors came and were made welcome by Banfield and his wife.

Late life

Banfield described Dunk Island as his "Isle of Dreams—this unkempt, unrestrained garden where the centuries gaze upon perpetual summer". He became ill towards the end of May 1923 and died on 2 June 1923 of peritonitis. His wife survived him, there were no children. He was buried under a cairn on Dunk Island. His grave and the cairn are now listed on the Queensland Heritage Register as the Banfield Memorial Reserve and Grave.

References
Margriet R. Bonnin, 'Banfield, Edmund James (1852–1923)', Australian Dictionary of Biography, Volume 7, MUP, 1979, pp 165–166

Further reading

External links

 
 Works by Edmund James Banfield at Project Gutenberg Australia
 
 Edmund James Banfield – 100th anniversary of "My Tropic Isle" – John Oxley Library Blog, State Library of Queensland

1852 births
1923 deaths
People from Ararat, Victoria
Australian travel writers
Australian journalists
Australian naturalists
English emigrants to Australia
Deaths from peritonitis
Journalists from Liverpool